Ralph Stephan (November 16, 1928 – April 30, 2018) was an American rower. He and John Wade competed in the men's coxless pair event at the 1948 Summer Olympics.

References

External links
 

1928 births
2018 deaths
American male rowers
Olympic rowers of the United States
Rowers at the 1948 Summer Olympics
Sportspeople from Cleveland